Old Burdon is a village in County Durham, England.

Villages in County Durham